The Albanian Volleyball League for women is a league competition featuring professional women volleyball clubs from Albania. It was founded in 1946 from the Albanian Federation of Volleyball, several days after the latter was formed. It is the top level volleyball league in Albania from its foundation. The team with the most championships are KV Tirana and Dinamo each with 20 championship trophies won.

The Albanian Volleyball League consists of 12 professional volleyball clubs in Albania and it's one of the oldest volleyball competition in the Balkans having started in 1946. The sport rapidly grew in Albania and by the 70s almost every city and town had its own volleyball club and volleyball field. After communism fell many of the volleyball clubs folded as many players left the country to play for foreign teams. The volleyball attendance decreased and the popularity of this sport fell down worryingly. However, after 1993 volleyball rose up again with many cities re-establishing their teams. Now in Albania there are twelve professional teams while there are plenty of amateur teams ready to enter the league.

Competition
The members of the Albanian Volleyball League are grouped in two divisions: Albanian Volleyball League and B2 League. Each division has six teams and they have to play four times against each other in two different phases during the regular season. In every phase a club plays each of the others twice, once at their home stadium and once at that of their opponents, for a total of 20 games played per season in the regular season.

After the regular season ends, the top four clubs qualify for the play-offs, where the team placed first faces the one placed fourth while the second and the third-placed teams play each other. From these encounters the team that gets first two victories qualifies while games are played once home, once away until the two victories are reached. The teams that win their encounters qualify for the finals which are played in the clubs' respective grounds; the game will once be played home and once away, depending on the draw. The first team that gets three victories is crowned as champion.

Clubs that win get two points and the ones that lose get one point. At the end of the regular season, the bottom two clubs miss the play-offs. The bottom club gets relegated while the fifth-placed club will play the second-placed club of the B2 League. The team that wins the play-out has the right to play in Albanian Volleyball League.

Winners
These are the winners of the Albanian Volleyball League

Trophy Ranking

KV Tirana 20 times

KS Dinamo 20 times

Skënderbeu Korçë 6 times

Studenti Tiranë 5 times

Teuta 4 times

SK Lushnja 4 times

UMB Volej 4 times

Partizani Tirana 4 times

Vllaznia Shkodër 3 times

Minatori 2 times

Flamurtari Vlorë 1 time

See also
 Albanian Volleyball Cup (Women)
 Albanian Volleyball Supercup (Women)

References

External links 
FSHV Official Website 
  Albanian Volleyball League. women.volleybox.net

Volleyball in Albania
Albania
Albania
Volleyball